Eric Allen Bell (born August 27, 1973) was a documentary film writer and director. His work includes The Bondage (2006). In 2012, he received significant media coverage for his views on Islam. He 
was involved in a dispute over the Islamic Center of Murfreesboro in Murfreesboro, Tennessee. He initially supported the mosque, but then became critical of Islam. He was a contributor to the Daily Kos, but after a series of posts critical of Islam, he was banned from the website. He then became a self-styled counter-jihad activist, and in 2012 he claimed to have received a wave of death threats as he was mistakenly thought to have made the trailer for Innocence of Muslims. Eric Allen Bell (Eric Edborg) died 06/08/2019, days after removing his never-finished film "American Infidel" from imdb.

References

External links
 

American critics of Islam
Counter-jihad activists
Living people
American documentary filmmakers
1973 births